"The Lone Duckling" is a song by South Korean pop music group g.o.d and released on May 7, 2014, as a teaser for their comeback and reunion to celebrate fifteen years since their debut in 1999. It was their first release since going on hiatus in December 2005.

Overview
The song is categorized as a ballad and was written and composed by Duble Sidekick, with the rap composed by Danny Ahn. Billboard describes the song as having "classic boy band harmonies with modern-day electronic elements for a hit that boasts a hint of nostalgia for old-school fans".

The title is a reference to the story of "The Ugly Duckling". The lyrics are sung from the perspective of an observer watching the duckling "crying" alone and likening one's own personal struggles to that of the duckling.

Track listing
Digital download
 "The Lone Duckling" – 4:24
 "The Lone Duckling" (instrumental) – 4:24

Release and reception
Despite being a pre-release for the upcoming eighth album, the single achieved what is known in the industry as an "all-kill", topping ten online music websites within two hours and temporarily displacing popular boy band EXO in the #1 spot on the Gaon Charts. It peaked at #1 on Billboard'''s Korea K-Pop Hot 100 and remained in the Top 30 for five consecutive weeks until the chart was discontinued in early July. The single finished second in the Inkigayo rankings for May 18 despite g.o.d not promoting the song at any music programs or being present at the show. Based on data compiled by the Gaon Music Chart it was the top-selling single for the month of May and remained in the top 50 for nine consecutive weeks. The first and only time g.o.d have performed the song as a quintet on a televised program was their appearance on You Hee-yeol's Sketchbook'' in September 2014.

As the single was intended to raise funds for victims of the Sewol ferry disaster, a music video was not made and the YouTube video uploaded by label CJ E&M only contains a screenshot of the group's logo and the song title. The video still garnered over a million views and was eighth most watched (internationally) K-pop music video in May.

The song was well received by fans and critics, who have noted the meaningful lyrics and "comforting" melody as a welcome respite in a tragic time and also praised group's decision to retain their unique and signature blend of R&B and rap rather than follow the current K-pop trends.

Charts

Awards and nominations

See also
 List of Korea K-Pop Hot 100 number ones
 List of Gaon Digital Chart number ones of 2014

References

External links
Track Information – Mnet 

G.o.d songs
2014 singles
2014 songs
Korean-language songs
Billboard Korea K-Pop number-one singles
Gaon Digital Chart number-one singles